(Homage to Federico García Lorca) is a work for chamber orchestra by the Mexican composer Silvestre Revueltas.

History

On 19 August 1936, the Spanish poet Federico García Lorca was murdered by fascist militia forces. Outraged, along with many other intellectuals and artists, in October Revueltas composed , one of his most important works, which was premiered on 14 November 1936 conducted by the composer.

Instrumentation
The work is scored for a chamber orchestra of piccolo, E clarinet, two trumpets, trombone, tuba, tamtam, xylophone, piano, two violins, and double bass. The absence of low woodwinds, violas, and cellos produces a sound meant to evoke a Mexican village band, or the sound of Indian music.

Analysis
The composition is in three movements:

The main, Allegro, section of the first movement is typical of Revueltas's orchestration. An almost constant rhythmic substructure in 4/16 time is produced by the staccato of the piano, repeated plaintive fourths in the violins, and an obstinately repeated G in semiquavers in the contrabasses. Over this texture, wind instruments present the thematic material, "at once sad and gay, in a light contrapuntal passage of the greatest transparency".

The second movement, Duelo, is written in a style close to the Andalusian martinetes sung by miners and prisoners awaiting sentence. In imitation of the characteristic hammer-and-anvil accompaniment, Revueltas wrote a major-second ostinato for xylophone and pizzicato double bass, over which the trumpet plays a mournful melody in C minor.

The final movement superimposes several ostinatos, a device Revueltas uses extensively throughout his oeuvre.

References

Sources

Further reading
 Estrada, Julio. 2012. Canto roto: Silvestre Revueltas. Vida y Pensamiente de México. México, D. F.: Fondo de Cultura Económica, Instituto de Investigaciones Estéticas, Universidad Nacional Autónoma de México. .
 Garland, Peter. 1991. In Search of Silvestre Revueltas: Essays 1978–1990. Santa Fe: Soundings Press.
 Hoag, Charles. 2002. "Algunos aspectos de las melodías de Revueltas", translated by Ricardo Miranda Pérez. In Diálogo de resplandores: Carlos Chávez y Silvestre Revueltas, edited by Ricardo Miranda Pérez and Yael Bitrán, 109–117. Ríos y raíces: Teoría y práctica del arte. México, D.F.: Consejo Nacional para la Cultura y las Artes (CONACULTA) (Dirección General de Publicaciones). .
 Kolb Neuhaus, Roberto. 2002. "Leyendo entre líneas, escuchando entre pautas: Marginalia paleográfica de Silvestre Revueltas". In Diálogo de resplandores: Carlos Chávez y Silvestre Revueltas, edited by Ricardo Miranda Pérez and Yael Bitrán, 68–96. Ríos y raíces: Teoría y práctica del arte. México, D.F.: Consejo Nacional para la Cultura y las Artes (CONACULTA) (Dirección General de Publicaciones). .
 Madrid, Alejandro L. 2000. "¿Influencias o elementos de retórica? Aspectos de centricidad en la obra de Silvestre Revueltas". Heterofonía: Revista de investigación musical, no. 122 (January–June): 19–38.
 Revueltas, Silvestre. 1958. Homenaje a Federico García Lorca (Homage to Federico García Lorca (score). New York: Southern Music Publishing Company.
 Vogt, Harry. 1986. "Hommages und Elegien in memoriam Federico García Lorca". Dissonanz, no. 9 (August): 15–17.

External links

, National Youth Orchestra of the Netherlands, Etienne Siebens conducting

Compositions by Silvestre Revueltas
1936 compositions
Chamber music compositions
Funerary and memorial compositions